Aleksandr Yudin (26 October 1949 – 1986) was a Soviet cyclist. He competed in the team pursuit event at the 1972 Summer Olympics.

References

External links
 

1949 births
1986 deaths
Soviet male cyclists
Olympic cyclists of the Soviet Union
Cyclists at the 1972 Summer Olympics
Place of birth missing